Lieutenant-Colonel Graham Seton Hutchison (20 January 1890 – 3 April 1946) was a British First World War army officer, military theorist, author of both adventure novels and non-fiction works and fascist activist. Seton Hutchison became a celebrated figure in military circles for his tactical innovations during the First World War but would later become associated with a series of fringe fascist movements which failed to capture much support even by the standards of the far right in Britain in the interbellum period. He made a contribution to First World War fiction with his espionage novel, The W Plan.

Military career
Hutchinson was born in Hampstead in January 1890. His father came from Inverness, although the family settled in London. He was educated at the Royal Military College, Sandhurst. Seton Hutchison first saw military service when he enlisted in the King's Own Scottish Borderers in 1909, remaining with the regiment until 1913. He spent time in colonial Africa, serving with the British South Africa Police and the Rhodesian Army before the outbreak of the First World War.

In 1914, he returned to the British Army initially with the 2nd Battalion, Argyll and Sutherland Highlanders and the Machine Gun Corps. In 1917 Seton Hutchison, at the time a Major and Machine Gun Officer in the 33rd Division, convinced his commanding officer to group all the machine gunners, who were spread between four brigades, into a single company under his command, a scheme that was soon rolled out across the British Army resulting in the Machine Gun Corps becoming an independent branch of the army. He also became noted for his strong opposition to retreat and recounted a story of how in March 1918 he shot all but two of a group of forty British soldiers fleeing from the German Imperial Army.

Seton Hutchison's exploits made him a well-known figure and he was awarded both the Distinguished Service Order and the Military Cross. A somewhat more unusual tribute followed in 1921 when the composer Kenneth J. Alford penned a marching tune, The Mad Major, in his honour.

Post-war activity
Following his war service Seton Hutchison took an interest in the welfare of ex-soldiers, forming the Old Contemptibles Association and then taking a leading role in setting up the British Legion. Between 1920 and 1921 he was part of the Upper Silesian Commission and he would write that his time there gave him significant sympathy with the defeated Germans and convinced him that the Treaty of Versailles was an unjust settlement.

His first involvement in party politics came with the Liberal Party and he was its candidate in Uxbridge in the 1923 general election, without success. He would soon after move towards a more right-wing position and became a member of the arch-conservative English Mistery soon after its foundation in 1930. He had previously led his own similar group, the Paladin League, although it did not enjoy such a high profile as English Mistery. His other political sympathies included a strong strain of anti-Semitism, which he claimed was engendered by contempt for his Jewish classmates whilst at school in Hampstead, and support for the Social Credit economic ideas of C. H. Douglas. During the 1930s he corresponded with Ezra Pound, largely over their shared interest in Social Credit.

Fascism
Like a small number of British Army officers after the First World War Seton Hutchison was attracted to the militarism of fascism and he became involved in a number of movements. He initially claimed to have a large band of supporters, including the ludicrous claim that he had 20,000 followers in Mansfield alone, and attempted in 1931 to merge this unnamed group with the British Fascists (BF). However Rotha Lintorn-Orman broke off negotiations when it became clear that Seton Hutchison had no movement at all to speak of.

In November 1933, Seton Hutchison formed his own group, the British Empire Fascist Party, and presented a 24-point programme for "National Reconstruction". This document, which was avowedly fascist unlike the BF (a group which, despite its name, had an underdeveloped ideology that was denounced by sometime member Arnold Leese as "conservatism with knobs on"), called for the destruction of the party system, the establishment of a corporate state with highly statist overtones, a stronger policy of imperialism and the removal of most rights from Britain's Jews.

The same year he also formed a group called the National Workers Movement, a group that changed its name to the National Socialist Workers Party before finally settling on the title of the National Workers Party. By this point Seton Hutchinson had become obsessed by Nazism and wrote widely in praise of the ideology and Adolf Hitler. Despite its pretensions to appealing to the working class the group only appeared to have one other regular member, Commander E.H. Cole, who was better known for his time in the Imperial Fascist League. Seton Hutchison, who was paid by Nazi Germany as a publicist, led the group largely because of his antipathy towards Oswald Mosley and his much larger British Union of Fascists, whom he believed to be under Jewish influence. Like the Nazis, Seton Hutchison on was strongly critical of Freemasonry and mainline Christianity, calling for a move to Positive Christianity. However it was to Mosley that Seton Hutchison lost his support as members of the Nordic League initially sympathetic towards the National Workers Party were won over to the BUF by the efforts of the likes of J.F.C. Fuller and Robert Gordon-Canning.

Seton Hutchison nonetheless remained a vocal activist and in 1936 ran afoul of Clement Attlee when he publicly claimed that the Labour Party politician was a Jew who was engineering a world war, supporting white slavery and punishing the poor. Attlee filed a libel action against Seton Hutchison, although this was ultimately withdrawn when Seton Hutchison publicly apologised and disowned the claims. Remaining a vocal Hitlerite, including declaring public support for the Anschluss, he became disillusioned by the German occupation of Czechoslovakia and by the time of the Invasion of Poland in 1939 Seton Hutchinson was praising Poland for standing up to what he had come to see as Hitler's bullying tactics.

Scottish nationalism
Although he had spent much of his early years in London Seton Hutchison saw himself as first and foremost Scottish and wrote "I have always flatly declined to describe myself as 'British'". In his 1945 essay "The Highland Division can Save Scotland", he declared his support for Scottish independence and declared his support for the Scottish National Party. He called for the return to the Clan system as a basis of a classless, corporatist Scotland, arguing the Scots represented a unique race. His ideas were largely undeveloped however as Seton Hutchison died the following year before expanding upon them.

Author
Seton Hutchison was also known as a prolific author of both espionage novels and military history. One of his spy novels, The W Plan, had its proofs read by D.H. Lawrence before publishing. Lawrence dismissed the book as poor for what he felt were its unconvincing attempts to portray Germany and its unrealistic portrayals of female characters. Despite Lawrence's criticisms a film version produced and directed by Victor Saville and starring Brian Aherne, Madeleine Carroll and Gordon Harker was made in 1930. His novels did find favour with Ezra Pound who praised them, along with those of John Hargrave, for what Pound felt was their "specific treatment of live economies". His final novel, The Red Colonel (1946), broke from some of his earlier stories in that it was highly critical of the Nazis, mirroring his own disillusionment with that movement.

Seton Hutchison also published a History of the Machine Gun Corps although this non-fiction work was characterised by its vivid accounts of battle that almost read like a novel. Another of his factual works was a biography of Peter McLintock, who had served as his batman during the war. His 1932 work Warrior, a consideration of the philosophy behind combat and war, was in a similar vein to Ernst Jünger's work on these topics. As a freelance journalist Seton Hutchison attended a few of the Nuremberg Rallies and was paid by Joseph Goebbels to write glowing tributes to the spectacles.

References

1890 births
1946 deaths
Antisemitism in the United Kingdom
Argyll and Sutherland Highlanders officers
British Army personnel of World War I
British military writers
British South Africa Police officers
Companions of the Distinguished Service Order
King's Own Scottish Borderers officers
Liberal Party (UK) parliamentary candidates
Recipients of the Military Cross
Rhodesian military personnel of World War I
Scottish fascists
Scottish nationalists
Scottish novelists
Graduates of the Royal Military College, Sandhurst
Machine Gun Corps officers
20th-century Scottish novelists
Scottish male novelists
20th-century British male writers